The 2007–08 Los Angeles Clippers season was their 38th season in the NBA and their 24th in Los Angeles.

Key dates prior to the start of the season:
 The 2007 NBA draft took place in New York City on June 28.
 The free agency period begins in July.

Draft picks
Los Angeles' selections from the 2007 NBA draft in New York City.

Roster

Roster Notes
 Forward Ruben Patterson and guard Smush Parker becomes the 13th and 14th former Lakers to play with the crosstown rival Clippers.
 Guard Guillermo Diaz signed two 10-day contracts and played 6 games.  When Diaz's contract expired, the team then signed guard Andre Barrett to a 10-day contract and played 4 games.  When his contract expired, the team then signed guard Smush Parker.

Regular season

Season standings

Record vs. opponents

Game log

November
Record:  6–8; Home: 4–4; Road: 2–4

December
Record: 4–9; Home: 1–4; Road: 3–5

January
Record: 4–9; Home: 4–6; Road: 0–3

February
Record: 5–9; Home: 2–3; Road: 3–6

March
Record: 3–15; Home: 2–6; Road: 1–9

April
Record: 1–7; Home: 0–3; Road: 1–4

 Green background indicates win.
 Red background indicates regulation loss.

Player statistics

Regular season 

*Total for entire season including previous team(s)

Awards and records

Records

Milestones

Transactions
The Clippers have been involved in the following transactions during the 2007–08 season.

Trades

Free agents

Re-signed

Additions

Subtractions

See also
 2007–08 NBA season

References

Los Angeles Clippers seasons
2007–08 NBA season by team